"Deep River Woman" is a song written by American R & B artist Lionel Richie and recorded by Richie with American country music group Alabama. It was released in December 1986 as the fourth single from Richie's album Dancing on the Ceiling. The song peaked at number 10 on the Billboard Hot Country Singles chart and number 71 on the Hot 100.

Chart performance

Cover versions
On Richie's 2012 duets album, Tuskegee, he re-recorded the song with Little Big Town. It charted on the Hot Country Songs chart from unsolicited airplay at number 60 for the week of June 16, 2012, spending only one week on the chart.

References

1987 singles
1986 songs
Lionel Richie songs
Alabama (American band) songs
Little Big Town songs
Songs written by Lionel Richie
Vocal collaborations
Song recordings produced by James Anthony Carmichael
Motown singles